

Y 

 
 
 
 
 
 
 
 
 
 
 
 
 
 
 
 
 
 
 
 
 
 
 
 
 
 
 
 
 
 
 
 
 
 
 
 
 
 
 
 
 
 
 
 
 
 
 
 
 
 
 
 
 
 
 
 
 
 
 
 
 
 
 
 
 
 
 
 
 
 
 
 
 
 
 
 
 
 
 
 
 
 
 
 
 
 
 
 
 
 
 
 
 
 
 
 
 
 
 
 
 
 
 
 
 
 
 
 
 
 
 
 
 
 
 
 
 
 
 
 
 
 
 
 
 
 
 
 
 
 
 
 
 
 
 
 
 
 
 
 
 
 
 
 2956 Yeomans
 
 
 
 990 Yerkes
 
 
 
 
 
 
 19848 Yeungchuchiu
 
 
 
 
 
 
 
 
 
 
 
 
 
 
 
 
 
 
 
 
 
 
 
 
 
 
 
 
 
 
 
 
 
 
 
 
 5176 Yoichi
 
 
 
 
 
 
 
 
 
 
 
 
 
 
 
 
 
 
 3823 Yorii
 
 
 
 
 
 54509 YORP
 
 
 
 
 
 
 
 
 
 
 
 
 
 
 
 
 
 
 
 
 
 
 
 
 
 
 
 
 
 
 
 
 
 
 
 
 
 
 
 
 
 
 
 
 
 
 
 
 
 
 
 
 
 
 
 
 
 
 
 351 Yrsa
 
 
 
 
 
 
 
 
 
 
 
 
 
 
 
 1554 Yugoslavia
 
 
 
 
 
 
 
 
 
 
 
 
 
 
 
 
 
 
 5855 Yukitsuna
 
 
 
 
 
 
 
 
 
 
 
 
 
 
 
 
 
 
 
 
 
 
 
 
 
 
 
 
 
 
 
 
 
 
 
 
 
 
 
 
 
 
 
 
 
 1340 Yvette
 
 1301 Yvonne

See also 
 List of minor planet discoverers
 List of observatory codes

References 
 

Lists of minor planets by name